Anthony Yaar? (spelt Anthoni – Yaar? onscreen) is a 2009 Tamil language film directed by C. T. Pandi. The film stars Shaam and Mallika Kapoor, while Lal, Vivek, and Rajesh play supporting roles. The music was composed by Dhina, and the film released on 31 July 2009.

Plot 
Anthony (Shaam) is an orphan who grows up in a church situated in a coastal village near Tuticorin. The local priest (Rajesh) is his benefactor. Anthony is loving and caring towards the local fishermen and their families who are being exploited by the rowdy Michael.

Cast 

Shaam as Anthony
Mallika Kapoor as Manju
Lal as Michael
Vivek as Kingfisher
Rajesh as a priest
Pragathi as Manju's sister-in-law
Prem Sankar as Manju's brother
Meenal as Kingfisher's love interest
Vennira Aadai Moorthy as Kumar
 Cell Murugan
 Premshankar
 Naanjil Richard
 Arulmani

Production 
During the development stages of the film, when the cast was being decided, Shaam went to visit actor Vadivelu to enquire about his availability and to sign him on to play a role in the film. Vadivelu refused to be a part of the film and subsequently verbally insulted Shaam, prompting the actor to lodge a complaint with the Nadigar Sangam about Vadivelu's conduct. The film was shot in Tuticorin. Shaam plays a fisherman in the film.

Music 
Soundtrack was composed by Dhina, with lyrics written by Pazhani Bharathi, Yugabharathi, Snehan and Kirithiya.

Critical reception 
A critic from The New Indian Express wrote that "A cliched sequence of events and amateur handling of the screenplay take away all the sheen in Anthony Yaar". A critic from Rediff opined that the film is "a throwback to the worst commercial potboilers of the 80s when the hero cult was in full swing, and very little made sense on celluloid". A critic from Dinamalar praised the bold attempt of the director, the music, and the cinematography. A critic from Sify wrote, "Shaam shows off his six-pack body, Mallika has hardly anything to do while Lal hams. The music is bad. Vivek's comedy track as Kingfisher is the only entertainment in the film, though he too is fast becoming repetitive. There is nothing here to recommend, and is total waste of time".

References

External links 

2000s Tamil-language films
2009 action films
2009 directorial debut films
2009 films
Indian action films